Surabhi is a village in Chakrayapet Block, Kadapa District (formerly Cuddapah), Andhra Pradesh, India.

References

Villages in Kadapa district